Stanley Bryon West (September 22, 1926January 19, 2005) was an American football defensive lineman in the National Football League for the Los Angeles Rams, the New York Giants, and the Chicago Cardinals. He played collegiate ball at the University of Oklahoma under head coach Bud Wilkinson, who was quoted as saying that, "Stan West is one of the most talented players I have ever coached, exhibiting more raw talent than any other player on the team only to be matched by his toughness and dedication."

References

1926 births
2005 deaths
People from Weatherford, Oklahoma
American football defensive tackles
Oklahoma Sooners football players
Los Angeles Rams players
New York Giants players
Chicago Cardinals players
Western Conference Pro Bowl players
Enid High School alumni